Wila Qullu (Aymara wila blood, blood-red, qullu mountain, "red mountain", also spelled Wila Kkollu) is a  mountain in the Bolivian Andes. It is located in the La Paz Department, Inquisivi Province, Colquiri Municipality. Wila Qullu lies northwest of Iru Pata and Jaqi Jiwata. The Wila Qullu River originates at the mountain. It flows to the Janq'u Quta River ("white lake" river) in the west.

References 

Mountains of La Paz Department (Bolivia)